Nicola Virginia Adams  (born 26 October 1982) is a British former professional boxer who competed from 2017 to 2019. She retired with an undefeated record and held the WBO female flyweight title in 2019. As an amateur, she became the first female boxer to become an Olympic champion after winning gold at London 2012, and the first double Olympic champion following a second gold medal at Rio 2016, both in the flyweight division. As of 27 May 2016 she was the reigning Olympic, World and European Games champion at flyweight, and won the entire set of amateur championships available to her – Olympic, Commonwealth and European Games' titles, and the World, European and European Union championships.

She is openly lesbian, and was named the most influential LGBT person in Britain by The Independent in 2012 and has been included in the annual Powerlist, being recognised as one of the most influential black Britons. She also became the first openly LGBT person to win an Olympic boxing gold medal, after her win at the 2012 Summer Olympics.

Early life
Adams was born in Leeds, West Yorkshire, on 26 October 1982. She was educated at Agnes Stewart Church of England High School, Ebor Gardens, Burmantofts, Leeds. She also went to Hopwood Hall College in Rochdale.

Amateur career

Adams represented Haringey Police Community Club at boxing. She fought (and won) her first bout at the age of 13, but it was four years before she found a second opponent.  In 2001, she became the first woman boxer ever to represent England, in a fight against an Irish boxer. In 2003, she became English amateur champion for the first time, and she retained the title at the next three championships.

In 2007, Adams became the first English female boxer to win a medal in a major boxing tournament, taking silver in the European Championships. She won silver again at the world championships in Ningbo, China, in 2008, which was Britain’s first women’s world championship medal in women’s boxing. Adams struggled to continue her boxing career due to lack of funds. She worked as an acting extra on soap operas such as Coronation Street, Emmerdale, and EastEnders, and worked as a builder before the International Olympic Committee backed funding for women's boxing in 2009.

In November 2010, Adams was victorious in the first-ever GB Amateur Boxing Championship at the Echo Arena Liverpool.  In 2011, she won gold medals at the European Union Championships and the European Championships. In July 2011, the BBC included Adams in a feature on "6 Promising Britons to watch in the Olympics".

In the 2012 Summer Olympics, Adams defeated Mary Kom from India in the Flyweight semi-final.  She went on to defeat Chinese boxer and world number one Ren Cancan in the final to claim the first Olympic women's boxing gold medal.

At the 2014 Commonwealth Games in Glasgow, Adams knocked out Michaela Walsh of Northern Ireland to take the gold medal in the women's flyweight division on a split decision.

At the 2016 Rio Olympic games Adams successfully defended her Olympic title, defeating Sarah Ourahmoune of France in the Final on 20 August.

Professional career 
On 23 January 2017 it was confirmed that Adams had turned professional, having signed with promoter Frank Warren. She made her debut on 8 April, scoring a four-round points decision victory against Virginia Carcamo at the Manchester Arena.

After securing another three wins, all by technical knockout, she faced former world champion Isabel Millan for the WBO interim female flyweight title on 6 October 2018 at the Morningside Arena in Leicester. Fighting beyond four rounds for the first time in her career, Adams defeated Millan via ten-round unanimous decision to capture the WBO interim title. Two judges scored the bout 97–93 and the third scored it 96–94. After the win Frank Warren stated, "She is a champion, there's no going backwards, on 22nd December I'm hoping it will be for the full title".

She was scheduled to challenge for the full world title on 8 March 2019 against reigning WBO female flyweight champion Arely Muciño at the Royal Albert Hall in London. However, the fight was postponed after Adams sustained an injury during training and was forced to withdraw. After Muciño suffered an injury during a successful defence of her title in April followed by an ankle injury sustained in a car crash, the WBO announced that Adams had been elevated from interim to full WBO champion in July 2019 due to Muciño being unable to "participate in active competition".

The first defence of her title came against former world title challenger Maria Salinas. The bout took place on 27 September 2019 at the Royal Albert Hall and was aired live on BT Sport in the UK and ESPN+ in the US. After eleven months out of the ring, in what was the first ever female professional boxing match to be held at the Royal Albert Hall, Adams retained her title with a split draw. One judge scored the bout 97–93 to Adams, another scored it 96–94 to Salinas, while the third scored it even at 95–95.

Retirement 
During the first round of her rematch with Salinas, Adams suffered a torn pupil. She initially thought it to be a minor injury. In an interview with BBC Radio 5 Live Adams said, "I didn't think it would be anything too serious but I had torn the pupil in my eye. I got the injury in the first round of my last fight [against Maria Salinas]. I phoned the doctors a couple of days afterwards. I could take the chance and keep boxing and hope nothing would happen to my eye or an unlucky punch could mean I lose my sight."

She announced her retirement on 6 November 2019 in an open letter in the Yorkshire Evening Post, saying, "I’m immensely honoured to have represented our country – to win double Olympic gold medals and then the WBO championship belt is a dream come true… But it’s not without taking its toll on my body, and aside from the expected aches and pains - I’ve been advised that any further impact to my eye would most likely lead to irreparable damage and permanent vision loss."

In April 2021, Adams joined fellow British Olympians Greg Rutherford and Kelly Smith, and fitness instructor Mr Motivator in launching the ‘Energy Fit for the Future’ campaign by Smart Energy GB, which aimed at encouraging people to install smart meters in their homes.

Honours and awards

Boxing championships

Other
In 2012, she became the first female boxer to receive an award from the Boxing Writers' Club of Great Britain. Specifically, she was awarded the Joe Bromley Award for outstanding services to boxing. She was also the first woman ever to be invited to the club's awards ceremony.

In 2012, too, she was a nominee for BBC Sports Personality of the Year.

In November 2012, she topped the list of The Independents 101 most influential LGBT people in Britain for 2012.

She was appointed Member of the Order of the British Empire (MBE) in the 2013 New Year Honours and later Officer of the Order of the British Empire (OBE) in the 2017 New Year Honours for services to boxing.

In July 2015, she was awarded an honorary Doctor of Laws degree by the University of Leeds. In November 2015, she was listed as one of BBC's 100 Women.

In 2016, Adams was named Number One in the DIVA Power List of the UK's most eminent lesbian and bisexual women.

In 2019 she was included in the annual Powerlist, being recognised as one of the most influential black Britons.

On 2 September 2020, it was announced that Adams would be a contestant on the eighteenth series of Strictly Come Dancing and that she would feature in the competition's first same-sex couple alongside professional Katya Jones. On 12 November 2020, they were forced to withdraw from the competition after Jones tested positive for COVID-19.

Professional boxing record

Personal life
On 12 July 2022, it was announced that Adams had welcomed her first child, alongside her girlfriend Ella Baig.

Television

See also
 2012 Summer Olympics and Paralympics gold post boxes

References

External links

 
 

1982 births
20th-century English LGBT people
21st-century English LGBT people
AIBA Women's World Boxing Championships medalists
Bantamweight boxers
BBC 100 Women
Black British sportswomen
Boxers at the 2012 Summer Olympics
Boxers at the 2014 Commonwealth Games
Boxers at the 2015 European Games
Boxers at the 2016 Summer Olympics
Commonwealth Games gold medallists for England
Commonwealth Games medallists in boxing
English Olympic medallists
English sportspeople of Saint Kitts and Nevis descent
English women boxers
European Games gold medalists for Great Britain
European Games medalists in boxing
Flyweight boxers
Lesbian sportswomen
LGBT Black British people
LGBT boxers
English LGBT sportspeople
Living people
Martial artists from Leeds
Medalists at the 2012 Summer Olympics
Medalists at the 2016 Summer Olympics
Officers of the Order of the British Empire
Olympic boxers of Great Britain
Olympic gold medallists for Great Britain
Olympic medalists in boxing
Undefeated world boxing champions
Medallists at the 2014 Commonwealth Games